Rosella Towne (January 20, 1918 – August 29, 2014) was an American film actress. She was born in Youngstown, Ohio. Her film career began in 1937, after making a screen test for Warner Bros. and signing a contract for the studio. At first she made minor appearances in motion pictures such as Varsity Show, It's Love I'm After and Submarine D-1. In 1939, she got her first leading role when she was chosen to play the part of comic-strip character Jane Arden in a film adaption. While touted by critics as a future star, Towne retired from showbusiness after marrying Harry Kronman, a Hollywood producer, in 1942. She died on August 29, 2014, aged 96. Towne was cremated.

Filmography

Varsity Show (1937) as passerby
It's Love I'm After (1937) as autograph seeker
Submarine D-1 (1937) as Mary
Expensive Husbands (1937) as Brenner's receptionist
Hollywood Hotel (1937) as secretary
Sergeant Murphy (1938) as Alice Valentine
The Patient in Room 18 (1938) as Maida Day
Blondes at Work (1938) as Louisa Revelle
Fools for Scandal (1938) as Diana
Gold Diggers in Paris (1938) as golddigger
Men Are Such Fools (1938) as Linda's secretary
Cowboy from Brooklyn (1938) as Panthea Landis
Sons of the Plains (short) (1938)
Boy Meets Girl (1938) as hospital nurse
Secrets of an Actress (1938) as seated party guest
Campus Cinderella (short) (1938) as co-ed
The Sisters (1938) as telephone operator
Hard to Get (1938) Miss Gray
Declaration of Independence (1938) as Betsy Kramer
Going Places (1938) as young lady at party
Yes, My Darling Daughter (1939) as Edith Colby
Secret Service of the Air (1939) as Zelma Warren
The Adventures of Jane Arden (1939) as Jane Arden
Women in the Wind (1939) as Phyllis
Dark Victory (1939) as girl in box
Code of the Secret Service (1939) as Elaine
The Private Lives of Elizabeth and Essex (1939) as lady of the court
Flight Angels (1940) as student
Rocky Mountain Rangers (1940) as Doris Manners
No, No, Nanette (1940) as stewardess
The Hard-Boiled Canary (1941) as girl
A Gentle Gangster (1943) as Helen Barton

References

External links
 
 Rosella Towne at the American Film Institute

1918 births
2014 deaths
American film actresses
20th-century American actresses
Actresses from Ohio
21st-century American women